This is a list of the foreign managers (head coaches) in Thai League 1 during the professional era which began in 1996. The following manager:

have coached in at least one Thai League T1 official game for the respective club;
are sorted by the nationality. Coaches from the same country are sorted by the year of appointment.

Australia 
Andrew Ord – BEC Tero Sasana – 2012
Aurelio Vidmar – Bangkok Glass, BG Pathum United, Bangkok United – 2016–2017, 2021, 2022–

Belgium 
René Desaeyere – Muangthong United, BEC Tero Sasana, Ratchaburi– 2010, 2013, 2018
Stéphane Demol – BEC Tero Sasana – 2013

Brazil  
Jose Alves Borges – TTM, Muangthong United, BEC Tero Sasana, Chiangrai United – 2004-2006, 2013-2014, 2019
Carlos Roberto de Carvalho – Bangkok Glass, Muangthong United, Police United – 2010-2011, 2014
Freddy Marinho – Sisaket – 2010
Reuter Moreira – Esan United, TOT – 2012, 2015
Alexandré Pölking– Army United, Suphanburi, Bangkok United– 2013-2020
Alexandre Gama – Buriram United, Chiangrai United, Muangthong United, Lamphun Warriors– 2014-2016(1)2020-2021(2), 2016-2018, 2019-2020, 2022-
Stefano Cugurra Teco – Osotspa, Navy – 2014-2016
Sérgio Farias–Suphanburi– 2015, 2016-2017
Sérgio Aparecido – Suphanburi – 2016
Ailton Silva– Chiangrai United, Chiangmai United– 2019, 2021-2022
Carlos Eduardo Parreira – Chiangmai, Khon Kaen United – 2018-2019, 2021-2022
Arthur Bernardes – Rayong – 2020
Emerson Pereira – Chiangrai United, Nongbua Pitchaya – 2020-2022, 2022-

Bulgaria  
Velizar Popov – Suphanburi, Sisaket – 2014,2017

Chile 
Jorge Enrique Amaya – BEC Tero Sasana – 2010

Croatia 
Dragan Talajić – Muangthong United – 2014–2016
Drago Mamić -Chainat Hornbill - 2017-2018

England  
Jason Withe – BEC Tero Sasana, Bangkok Bank F.C., Songkhla United – 1999–2001, 2003–2005, 2014
Robbie Fowler – Muangthong United – 2011
Dave Booth – BEC Tero Sasana, Sisaket – 2006, 2011
Peter Butler – BEC Tero Sasana – 2011
Phil Stubbins – Police United, Bangkok Glass – 2012–2013
Scott Cooper – Buriram United, Muangthong United, Ubon UMT United F.C., Port  – 2013–2014, 2017, 2022– 
Gary Stevens – Army United, Port – 2014–2015 
Peter Withe – PTT Rayong – 2014
Mike Mulvey – BEC Tero Sasana - 2017
Kevin Blackwell – Nakhon Ratchasima – 2022–

Finland  
Mika Lönnström – Police United, Saraburi – 2014, 2015
Mixu Paatelainen – Ubon UMT United – 2018

France  
Regis Laguesse – BEC Tero Sasana – 2007
Christophe Larrouilh – BEC Tero Sasana – 2008-2009

Germany  
Peter Stubbe – BEC Tero Sasana – 1996
Hans Emser – Bangkok Glass – 2009
Winfried Schäfer – Muangthong United – 2013
Franz Schwarzwälder – Songkhla United – 2013
Christian Ziege - Ratchaburi - 2018
Goran Barjaktarević – Chonburi  – 2018
Dennis Amato - Chainat Hornbill F.C., Sukhothai - 2016–2019, 2022–

Iran  
Afshin Ghotbi – Buriram United – 2016

Italy  
Marco Simone - Ratchaburi - 2019

Japan  
Masahiro Wada – Chonburi, Port – 2014, 2015
Koichi Sugiyama – BBCU, Chainat– 2016
Sugao Kambe – Nakhon Ratchasima, Ubon UMT United– 2013–2016, 2018
Tetsuya Murayama – Samut Prakan City – 2019
Masami Taki – Chiangrai United, Rayong, PT Prachuap – 2020-2021
Masatada Ishii – Samut Prakan City, Buriram United – 2019–
Yasushi Yoshida – Samut Prakan City – 2021–2022
Makoto Teguramori – BG Pathum United – 2022–

Netherland 
Henk Wisman – Chiangrai United – 2013

Northern Ireland 
Kenny Shiels – BEC Tero Sasana – 2015

Nigeria 
Adebayo Gbadebo – Suphanburi– 2017-

North Macedonia 
Mario Gjurovski – Muangthong United – 2020–

Portugal  
Henrique Calisto – Muangthong United – 2011
Rui Bento – Bangkok United – 2014
Manuel Cajuda – BEC Tero Sasana – 2015
 Bruno Pereira – Ratchaburi Mitr Phol – 2022

Scotland 
Matt Elliott – Army United – 2014

Serbia  
Slaviša Jokanović – Muangthong United – 2012–2013
Božidar Bandović  – Buriram United, BEC Tero Sasana, Sisaket – 2014–2020
Miloš Joksić– Pattaya United, Nakhon Ratchasima– 2016–2019
Branko Smiljanić – BEC Tero Sasana – 2016
Ranko Popović–Buriram United– 2016–2017
Radovan Ćurčić – Muangthong United – 2018
Ljubomir Ristovski  – Navy, Sukhothai  – 2018–2019

Spain  
Ivan Palanco – Ratchaburi – 2013
Alejandro Menéndez  – Buriram United – 2013
Ricardo Rodríguez – Ratchaburi, Bangkok Glass, Suphanburi – 2013–2015, 2016
Josep Ferré – Ratchaburi – 2015
Pacheta – Ratchaburi– 2016–2017
Manolo Márquez – Ratchaburi – 2018-2019
Xavi Moro – Ratchaburi – 2022–

South Korea 
Kim Kyung-Ju  – Sisaket – 2010
Bae Myung-Ho – TTM – 2011
Lee Young-moo – TTM – 2011
Kim Hak-chul-Pattaya United – 2016
Yoon Jong-hwan – Muangthong United – 2019

Sweden 
Sven-Göran Eriksson  – BEC Tero Sasana – 2012

Tunisia 
Lassaad Chabbi – Ratchaburi – 2018

Wales 
 Jason Brown - Air Force Central- 2018-2019

See also
List of Thai League 1 managers

Thai League 1 managers